Goona Warra is a civil parish of Waljeers County  in the Riverina area Far West, New South Wales, Australia.

The parish is between Hay, New South Wales and Booligal in Hay Shire.
The main feature of the parish is Waljeers lake, and the Lachlan River. The area is semi arid and the main economy is broad acre agriculture.

References

Riverina